The second edition of the European Short Course Swimming Championships was held in Ponds Forge International Sports Centre in Sheffield, England, from 11 to 13 December 1998. A total number of 355 swimmers from 34 nations competed in these championships.

Medal table

Medal summary

Men's events

Women's events

Abbreviations
 WR: World record
 ER: European record
 WBT: World best time (Not an official world record, because world governing body FINA doesn't recognize 4×50 m relay times)

References
Results on GBRSports.com
Results

 
European Short Course Swimming Championships
European
1998
S
Sports competitions in Sheffield
International aquatics competitions hosted by the United Kingdom
1990s in Sheffield
European Short Course Swimming Championships